The men's horizontal bar competition for artistic gymnastics at the 2021 Southeast Asian Games in Vietnam was held from 16 May 2022 at Quần Ngựa Sports Palace.

Schedule
All times are in Indochina Time (UTC+7).

Results

Qualification

Final

References

Men's horizontal bar